Sherpa may refer to:

Ethnography
 Sherpa people, an ethnic group in north eastern Nepal
 Sherpa language

Organizations and companies
 Sherpa (association), a French network of jurists dedicated to promoting corporate social responsibility
 Sherpa.ai, a Spanish artificial intelligence company
 Sherpa Capital, an American venture capital firm
 Sherpa (delivery service), an Australian courier company
 SHERPA (organisation), a UK-based project team with expertise in open access and repositories
 SHERPA/RoMEO, a service to show copyright and policies of academic journals
 Cloud Sherpas, an American cloud implementation and migration company, active 2008–2015

Transportation
 Porter (carrier), often called a sherpa
 Mountain guide, also sometimes called a sherpa
 Leyland Sherpa, a light commercial vehicle produced from the 1970s until 2006
 Short C-23 Sherpa, a military variant of the Short 330 cargo aircraft, first flight was in 1982
 Short SB.4 Sherpa, an experimental British aircraft whose first flight was in 1955
 Super Sherpa, a 250 cc dual-purpose motorcycle produced by Kawasaki
 A series of military trucks produced by Renault Trucks Defense, including the Sherpa Light
 UP Sherpa Bi, a German paraglider design
 SHERPA (space tug), a kick start space tug and satellite dispenser

Other uses
 Agelena sherpa, a spider of family Agelenidae
 Sherpa (emissary), the personal representative of a head of state or government in the G20 or G7
 Sherpa (fabric), a fabric with a pile on one side
 Sherpa (film), a 2015 documentary film
 Sherpa Fire, a 2016 wildfire that burned in Santa Barbara County, California
 Sherpa Glacier, an alpine glacier in Washington state
 Sherpa Peak, a mountain in Washington state 
 Sherpa (political consultant), a political consultant guiding a nominee to Senate confirmation
 Yahoo Sherpa, a distributed key value datastore developed by Yahoo!

See also
 Sherpur (disambiguation)

Language and nationality disambiguation pages